Richard S. Ruback is an American economist currently the Willard Prescott Smith Professor of Corporate Finance at the Harvard Business School. He previously taught at the MIT Sloan School of Management. He earned his PhD from the University of Rochester.

References

Year of birth missing (living people)
Living people
University of Rochester alumni
MIT Sloan School of Management faculty
Harvard Business School faculty
20th-century American economists
21st-century American economists